Ganja International Airport  is an airport serving Ganja (also known as Gyandzha), the second-largest city in Azerbaijan.

It was previously used by the Soviet Air Force. In 1996 the airport received the status of an international airport and since then is used for civil aviation purposes.

In August 2021 IATA announced a newly assigned code of “GNJ”, which will reflect the city's new name. The former code of “KVD” refers to the old toponym, Kirovabad.

2020 Nagorno-Karabakh war
During the 2020 Nagorno-Karabakh war, Arayik Harutyunyan, president of the self-proclaimed Republic of Artsakh, on 4 October 2020 stated that the Artsakh Defense Army had hit Ganja's military airport, however, Azerbaijan said no military sites were hit. Reporters of Russian TV channel Dozhd reported that the airport had not been hit and that the airport had been closed since March due to coronavirus. Missiles hit residential buildings in the city, killing 1 person and wounding 32. 

On September 29, the Ministry of Defence of Armenia stated that a Turkish Air Force F-16 Viper shot down an Armenian Su-25 flying inside Armenian airspace, killing the pilot—also stating that Turkish F-16 jets had taken off earlier from Ganja airport and were assisting Azerbaijani forces in missile strikes against border regions near Vardenis in the Gegharkunik Province of Armenia.  In response to the Armenian claim, the assistant to the President of Azerbaijan, Hikmet Hajiyev, stated that "Azerbaijan doesn't have F-16s – there aren't any on our soil or in our airspace". He claimed in turn that the aforementioned Su-25 as well as another Armenian Su-25 had crashed in the air while flying towards Azerbaijan. 

A week later on October 7, satellite imagery was published by the New York Times Visual Investigations Team confirming the presence of two F-16 Vipers at the airport. Following the publication of the satellite imagery, Azerbaijani president Ilham Aliyev conceded the official position regarding the F-16s' presence and that they had arrived to the country during military exercises prior to the war, but claimed they were not participating in combat.

Facilities

Airlines and destinations

Statistics

See also
 Transport in Azerbaijan
 List of airports in Azerbaijan

References

External links
 
 
 

Airports in Azerbaijan
Airport
Soviet Air Force bases